The Water Lily is a cocktail made with gin, crème de violette, orange liquor such as triple sec or cointreau, and fresh lemon juice. It can be garnished with orange zest and served in a coupe glass.

The variation White Lily is made with gin, rum and Cointreau, and the anise-flavored French liquor pastis, omitting the violet liquor.

See also
Aviation
Arsenic and Old Lace

References

Cocktails with gin
Cocktails with crème de violette
Cocktails with triple sec or curaçao
Cocktails with lemon juice
Cocktails with rum
Cocktails with anise-flavored liquors